Alexander McDougall (1732–1786) was an American seaman, merchant and military leader during the Revolutionary War.

Alexander McDougall or MacDougall may also refer to:

 Alexander McDougall (ship), an 1898 "whaleback" ship
 Alexander McDougall (ship designer) (1845–1923), Scottish-born American seaman and ship designer
 Alexander of Argyll (died 1310), or Alexander MacDougall, Scottish magnate
 Alexander MacDougall (cricketer) (1837–1917), English cricketer

McDougall, Alexander